Echoing Love,  is a 2011 Singaporean anthology film directed by Edmund Chen, Xiang Yun, Erica Lee, Vincent Ng, Nathaniel Ho and Alaric Tay. The film won the Special Achievement award at the 2011 Singapore International Film Festival.

Cast
 Huang Yiliang
 Xiang Yun
 Chen Xi
 Chen Yixin
 Alaric Tay
 Vincent Ng
 Jiu Jian
 Lai Meiqi

Release
The film was screened at the 2011 Singapore International Film Festival and the fifth International Chinese Film Festival in Sydney. It did not receive a theatrical release.

References

External links
 

2011 films
Singaporean drama films
Singaporean anthology films